Ronc may refer to:

 Ronco Canavese
 Roncq

People 
 Carlo Ronc, Italian ski mountaineer
 Osvaldo Ronc (b. 1947), Italian ski mountaineer